The Inkigayo Chart is a music program record chart that gives an award to the best-performing single of the week in South Korea. The chart measured digital performance in domestic online music services (60%), social media via YouTube views (35%), and advanced viewer votes (5%), in its ranking methodology. The candidates for the number-one song of the week received additional points from live votes.

Chart history

Notes

References 

2014 in South Korean music
2014 record charts
Lists of number-one songs in South Korea